Tony Elston Blain (born 17 February 1962) was a cricketer who played for the New Zealand national cricket team in 11 Test matches and 38 One Day Internationals. He was primarily an understudy to Ian Smith and Adam Parore in the New Zealand side.

Domestically Blain played for Central Districts and then for Canterbury cricket team during the 1983–84 season under the captaincy of Roddy Fulton. Blain was a polished right handed batsman and excellent wicket keeper he also played cricket in the Bradford Cricket League in England,Bradford after leaving New Zealand in 1984.

After retiring from the game he went from coaching to a commentator and later became a teacher in the United Kingdom for Dixons Allerton Academy in Bradford.

External links
 Interview with Tony Blain. University of Auckland, New Zealand, 2008: Alumni and Friends.
 Tony Blain, New Zealand. ESPN Cricinfo, statistics.
 Cricket: Blain on love, life and that '86 England Tour. New Zealand Herald, 26 May 2013.

1962 births
Living people
Canterbury cricketers
Central Districts cricketers
New Zealand One Day International cricketers
New Zealand Test cricketers
New Zealand cricketers
South Island cricketers
Wicket-keepers